The chapters of the Japanese manga series Hoshin Engi were written and illustrated by Ryu Fujisaki, and serialized in Weekly Shōnen Jump June 24, 1996 until November 6, 2000. Shueisha collected the individual chapters in 23 tankōbon volumes, with the first released on November 1, 1996 and volume 23 released on December 22, 2000. Shueisha later re-released the series in 18 kanzenban volumes, with the first volume released on July 4, 2005 and volume 18 released on April 4, 2006. The series is based on the ancient Chinese novel Investiture of the Gods, and as such follows Chinese mythology and history, focusing on the last members of the Shang dynasty and the plot to overthrow them.

Viz Media announced at Comic-Con 2006 that they had acquired the rights to translate Hoshin Engi into English and distribute it in North America. Viz released volume 1 on June 5, 2007, and finished releasing the series in 2011 (see below). The series has also been licensed in French by Glénat, in German by Egmont Manga & Anime, in Dutch by Glénat Benelux, and in Chinese in Taiwan by Tong Li Publishing.

Hoshin Engi has been adapted into a 26-episode anime television series titled Soul Hunter by the Japanese animation studio Studio Deen. The TV series, which was directed by Junji Nishimura, aired on TV Tokyo from July 3 to December 25, 1999. Hoshin Engi has also had several other adaptations, including a video game for the Game Boy Advance and WonderSwan, and several audio dramas released in 2005.



Volume list

References

Hoshin Engi